Delaina Dixon is an entertainment journalist and television host. She was a co-host of VH1's morning show The Gossip Table and is the editor-in-chief of the entertainment and lifestyle website DivaGalsDaily.com.

Education
Dixon attended Boston University's College of Communication, where she co-created the long-running student-run drama series Bay State.

Career
The editor-in-chief and a contributing columnist to DivaGalsDaily.com, Dixon was previously Entertainment Editor for OK! magazine in the US and wrote for TV Guide online.

The Gossip Table debuted on June 3, 2013, with Dixon as one of five entertainment columnists presenting entertainment news and gossip. In May 2013 TGT executive producer Shane Farley called Dixon and her four co-hosts "the best in the business."

In October 2013, Jet magazine announced a collaboration with Dixon in which she and her staff at DivaGalsDaily.com would be regular contributors to the magazine's website, JETMag.com.

References

External links
 
 
 DivaGalsDaily.com

Living people
Boston University College of Communication alumni
African-American journalists
African-American television personalities
American columnists
American magazine editors
Women magazine editors
American television talk show hosts
Year of birth missing (living people)
21st-century African-American people